Mae Sao is a tambon (subdistrict) of Mae Ai District, in Chiang Mai Province, Thailand. In 2020 it had a total population of 12,546 people.

Administration

Central administration
The tambon is subdivided into 16 administrative villages (muban).

Local administration
The whole area of the subdistrict is covered by the subdistrict administrative organization (SAO) Mae Sao (องค์การบริหารส่วนตำบลแม่สาว).

References

External links
Thaitambon.com on Mae Sao

Tambon of Chiang Mai province
Populated places in Chiang Mai province